Cowgill may refer to:

Placenames 
 Cowgill, Cumbria, England
 Cowgill, Missouri, United States
 Cowgill Hall

Surname 
 Anthony Cowgill (1915–2009), British army officer and researcher
 Bryan Cowgill (1927–2008), British television executive
 Calvin Cowgill (1819–1903), politician
 Collin Cowgill (born 1986), American baseball player
 Darian Cowgill (born 1972), American mix engineer, mastering engineer, and record producer
 George Cowgill (1929–2018), American anthropologist and archaeologist
 Jack Cowgill (born 1997), English footballer
 James Cowgill (1848–1922), politician
 Joseph Cowgill (1860–1936), English prelate of the Roman Catholic Church
 Joseph W. Cowgill (1908–1986), politician
 Makenna Cowgill (born 1998), American child actress
 Peter Cowgill (born 1953), British businessman
 Ursula Cowgill (1927–2015), American biologist
 Warren Cowgill (1929–1985), American linguist